Atsushi Kazama (born 3 March 1964) is a Japanese biathlete. He competed at the 1992 Winter Olympics and the 1998 Winter Olympics.

References

External links
 

1964 births
Living people
Japanese male biathletes
Olympic biathletes of Japan
Biathletes at the 1992 Winter Olympics
Biathletes at the 1998 Winter Olympics
Sportspeople from Niigata Prefecture
Asian Games medalists in biathlon
Biathletes at the 1990 Asian Winter Games
Asian Games gold medalists for Japan
Asian Games bronze medalists for Japan
Medalists at the 1990 Asian Winter Games
20th-century Japanese people